The Promised Land is an outdoor bronze sculpture by David Manuel, de-accessioned in 2020, formerly located in Chapman Square (Plaza Blocks), in Portland, Oregon.

Description and history
The Promised Land is a bronze sculpture depicting a pioneer family, including a father, mother and son, at the end of their journey. It was commissioned by the Oregon Trail Coordinating Council for $150,000 to commemorate the 150th anniversary of the Oregon Trail. The sculpture measures approximately  x  x . The Smithsonian Institution offers the following description:

The sculpture was completed and copyrighted in 1993, and dedicated on March 17 of that year. According to Smithsonian, which surveyed the work through its "Save Outdoor Sculpture!" program in October 1993, the sculpture was located at the Oregon History Center at 1200 Southeast Park Avenue and was administered by the Oregon Trail Coordinating Council. It was set on a laminated board base which measured approximately  x  x  and weighed 3,000 lbs., and was considered "well maintained" at the time of the survey. 

The sculpture was installed at Chapman Square, one of the Plaza Blocks, and rested on a red granite slab which contains an inscription of a quote by Thomas Jefferson. The plaza in front of the sculpture has sandblasted black bear, coyote, elk, grouse, jackrabbit, black bear and porcupine footprints, plus moccasin prints.

Vandalism and removal
The artwork was vandalized during the local George Floyd protests, and later removed and stored out of public view.

See also

 1993 in art
 Covered Wagon (sculpture), in Salem
 City on a Hill
 Manifest Destiny

References

External links
 The Promised Land - Portland, OR at Waymarking.com
 'Bah, Humbug' Greets Statue Depicting Pioneer Family : Oregon Trail: Portland arts commission rejects bronze by nationally known artist that features rugged Bible-toting Christians. Panel terms it culturally insensitive, possessing little artistic merit. by Andrew Waters (April 3, 1994), Los Angeles Times

1993 establishments in Oregon
1993 sculptures
Bronze sculptures in Oregon
Oregon Trail
Outdoor sculptures in Portland, Oregon
Plaza Blocks
Removed statues
Sculptures of children in Oregon
Sculptures of men in Oregon
Sculptures of women in Oregon
Statues in Portland, Oregon
Vandalized works of art in Oregon